A sodenbrunnen is a sod cistern used in the saltwater marshlands of Northern Germany from the early first millennium AD to the Middle Ages to collect rain water for drinking.

External links
Insel-Museum 

History of water supply and sanitation
Water supply and sanitation in Germany